The following lists events that happened during 1983 in Burundi.

Incumbents
President: Jean-Baptiste Bagaza
Prime Minister: Post abolished (13 October 1978 – 19 October 1988)

Births
 18 May - Christian Nduwimana, Burundian football player

Deaths
 16 July - Michel Micombero, Burundian military officer and statesman, 8th Prime Minister and 1st President of Burundi (b. 1940)

See also
History of Burundi

References

1980s in Burundi
Years of the 20th century in Burundi
Burundi
Burundi